Jane Philpott   (née Little; born November 23, 1960) is a physician, academic administrator, and former Canadian politician who represented the riding of Markham—Stouffville in the House of Commons. Philpott was first elected in the 2015 federal election as a member of the Liberal Party and was appointed to the Cabinet of the 29th Canadian Ministry, headed by Justin Trudeau, on November 4, 2015. On March 4, 2019, Philpott resigned from her cabinet position as President of the Treasury Board over the SNC-Lavalin affair. On April 2, 2019, she and Jody Wilson-Raybould were both expelled from the Liberal caucus in the aftermath of the controversy.

Philpott ran for re-election, as an independent candidate, in the 2019 federal election. She was defeated by Liberal candidate Helena Jaczek, placing third in the race with 20.8% of the popular vote.

Prior to entering politics, Philpott was a family physician known for promoting medical education in Africa, HIV/AIDS fundraising, refugee advocacy, and her work on the social determinants of health.

In February 2020, Philpott was appointed dean of the Queen's University Faculty of Health Sciences and director of the Queen's School of Medicine, and CEO, Southeastern Ontario Academic Medical Organization, effective July 1, 2020.

Early life and education
Philpott was born Jane Little in Toronto, Ontario. Her childhood was spent in Winnipeg, Manitoba; Princeton, New Jersey, in the United States; and Cambridge, Ontario. Her father, The Reverend Wallace Little, was a Presbyterian minister. Her mother was a schoolteacher. She is the oldest of four daughters.

Philpott attended high school at Galt Collegiate Institute. She received a Bachelor of Science and medical training at University of Western Ontario, where she was granted a Doctorate of Medicine, graduating cum laude in 1984. She later earned a Master of Public Health, with a concentration in Global Health, in 2012 from the Dalla Lana School of Public Health at the University of Toronto. Philpott also completed a Tropical Medicine Fellowship at Toronto General Hospital in Toronto, Ontario, in 1986–87. From 1984 to 1986 she completed a Family Medicine Residency at the University of Ottawa/Ottawa Civic Hospital in Ottawa, Ontario.

Medical career
Philpott was a family doctor in Markham–Stouffville from 1998 to 2015. She served as Chief of the Department of Family Medicine at Markham Stouffville Hospital from 2008 to 2014. She was concurrently Associate Professor in the University of Toronto’s Department of Family and Community Medicine. She was the Lead Physician of the  Health For All Family Health Team in Markham, Ontario.

She worked in Niger in West Africa from 1989-1998 with a faith-based non-governmental organization, where she practiced general medicine and developed a training program for village health workers. She returned to Niger in 2005 with Médecins sans Frontières during a food crisis.

She was the Family Medicine lead in the Toronto Addis Ababa Academic Collaboration (TAAAC) from 2008 to 2014. In this capacity she helped colleagues at Addis Ababa University to develop the first training program for Family Medicine in Ethiopia that began in 2013. The first seven students in this programme graduated in early 2016.

Philpott has been an advocate for Canada to give greater attention to the rights of refugees, particularly in respect of the health care afforded to them. In an article in the Toronto Star in 2014 she argued that "the Conservative government's cuts to refugee health care are 'cruel and unusual.

Philpott is a co-curator of TEDxStouffville founded in 2012 with Dr. Eileen Nicolle. The TEDxStouffville committee, a collaboration between Health for All Family Health Team, Markham Stouffville Hospital, the University of Toronto and residents of the town of Whitchurch–Stouffville, develops its program with live speakers on the theme of Social Determinants of Health.

HIV/AIDS Advocacy Work
"A Coin for Every Country" was an educational campaign geared to intermediate level classrooms to raise funds for the Stephen Lewis Foundation in response to the HIV/AIDS pandemic. Philpott was a founder of this initiative, that was delivered through schools in the York Region District School Board. Philpott is the founder of the "Give a Day to World AIDS" movement which started in 2004 as a way to engage Canadians in responding to HIV. Since 2004, Give a Day has grown in the medical, legal and business communities and, as of 2014, had raised over 75 million dollars to help those affected by HIV in Africa.

Special Advisory Work

In April 2019, Philpott was appointed as the Special Advisor on Health for the Nishnawbe Aski Nation, an organization representing 49 First Nation communities of Treaty 5 and Treaty 9 in northern Ontario.

In June 2020, Philpott was appointed as the Ministers’ Special Advisor for the Ontario Health Data platform.

Queen's University 
Philpott was named the Dean of the Faculty of Health Sciences and Director of the School of Medicine for Queen's University in early 2020. She also serves as the CEO of the Southeastern Ontario Academic Medical Organization. Her five-year term in these positions started in July 2020.

Philpott has advocated the national decriminalization of the simple possession of illicit drugs to help cope with the increasing number of overdose deaths.

In September 2020, Philpott opened an Office of Equity, Diversity, and Inclusion in the Faculty of Health Sciences. She spearheaded the creation of the Dean’s Action Table on Equity, Diversity, and Inclusion, which consists of an executive and seven working groups, and launched the Equity, Diversity, and Inclusion Fund.

In early December 2020, Philpott and two colleagues from the medical establishment in Kingston advocated a type of "no-fault insurance" scheme for manufacturers of COVID-19 vaccine, in order to indemnify them and shift the burden to the federal government.

Philpott initiated the creation of the Dean’s Initiative for Indigenous Summer Programs and renewed focus on strengthening Queen’s relationship with the Weeneebayko Area Health Authority (WAHA). Philpott also initiated the change to the QuARMS (Queen’s Accelerated Route to Medical School) admissions policy, designating all 10 seats for Indigenous peoples and Black Canadians.

Philpott spearheaded the planning process for the launch of a new global health institute in the Faculty of Health Sciences.

Federal politics
Philpott was acclaimed as the federal Liberal candidate in the new riding of Markham—Stouffville in April 2014. During the 2015 Canadian federal election campaign she was frequently called upon by the party to be a spokesperson on the subject on the CBC programme Power & Politics. She was critical of the Conservative government's lack of action and the returning of more than $350 million to the federal treasury in unspent funds over a three-year period, a sum that included millions for processing refugee applications and helping asylum-seekers settle into Canada. Following the death of Alan Kurdi she joined Marc Garneau in calling for increased refugee settlement in Canada by the end of 2015.

Philpott defeated the incumbent (from the redistributed riding of Oak Ridges—Markham), Paul Calandra. When asked by Campbell Clark of The Globe and Mail why she would move from medicine to politics she quoted Rudolf Virchow, the noted German physician who had a less successful political career, to explain why she sees economics and environment as key to human health, and chose to run for office: "Politics is nothing but medicine writ large."

Minister of Health
Philpott was appointed Minister of Health in the Cabinet of the 29th Canadian Ministry, headed by Justin Trudeau, on November 4, 2015. She is the first medical doctor to hold the post. Philpott was also appointed to the following Cabinet Committees on November 4, 2015.
Treasury Board (Member)
Cabinet Committee on Inclusive Growth, Opportunities and Innovation (Chair). This committee considers strategies designed to promote inclusive economic growth, opportunity, employment and social security, including sectoral strategies and initiatives.
Cabinet Committee on Intelligence and Emergency Management (Member). This committee meets "as required to consider intelligence reports and priorities and to coordinate and manage responses to public emergencies and national security incidents". It regularly reviews the state of Canadian emergency readiness.

On November 9, 2015 she was appointed to chair a cabinet sub-committee to co-ordinate government efforts to resettle 25,000 Syrian refugees in Canada through government sponsorship by the end of 2015.

On May 1, 2016, after the new government had been in office for six months, David Akin, Parliamentary Bureau Chief of the Toronto Sun, published a rating of the Liberal Cabinet's work to date in which Philpott was awarded an A+. "A real-life doctor before politics, Philpott has been a quick master of a high-profile file and is flawlessly executing against her mandate letter from the PM. She's confident talking to Canadians about health policy issues. And she's handled controversial files such legalizing marijuana and dealing with mental health crises on First Nations with pitch-perfect tone. An easy standout in Trudeau's cabinet." Alise Mills, a Vancouver-based conservative political analyst, further commented "Gracious, composed and knows her files."

Issues addressed by Philpott in her first six months as Minister of Health include: Syrian refugees; Bill C-14 on Physician Assisted Dying; removal of cuts to refugee health plans made by the previous government; Safe Injection Sites; renegotiation of the Canada Health Accord with the provinces; establishment of a pan-Canadian Pharmaceutical Alliance; Indigenous health care issues, in particular mental health, including high rates of suicide, improving infrastructure for clean water on reserves, reforming child welfare to reduce the over-apprehension of Indigenous children, and violence in La Loche, Saskatchewan, and the Attawapiskat First Nation; the Zika virus outbreak; and the legalization of marijuana where she announced the government's plans at the United Nations on April 20, 2016.

On May 11, 2016, Philpott was appointed to the "Ad Hoc Committee on Northern Alberta Wildfires", a new ad hoc Cabinet committee to coordinate federal efforts to help the thousands of Canadians affected by the wildfires that raged through Northern Alberta in May 2016.

During the week of May 22–28, 2016, she chaired the annual Commonwealth Health Ministers meeting in Geneva, Switzerland and also led the Canadian delegation at the 69th World Health Assembly (WHA).

Minister of Indigenous Services
Philpott became the inaugural Minister of Indigenous Services in a cabinet shuffle on August 28, 2017; she was succeeded by Ginette Petitpas Taylor at the Ministry of Health.

President of the Treasury Board
On January 14, 2019, Prime Minister Justin Trudeau moved Philpott from her cabinet Indigenous Services portfolio to her new role as President of the Treasury Board.

On March 4, 2019, Philpott resigned from her position in the cabinet as President of the Treasury Board, citing her inability to reconcile with the government's handling of the SNC-Lavalin affair.

Independent MP 

On April 2, 2019, Philpott was expelled from the Liberal parliamentary caucus. Though already nominated to run as a Liberal in the next federal election, Philpott subsequently announced that she would run as an independent candidate for Markham—Stouffville in the 2019 Canadian federal election.

On August 14, 2019, Mario Dion, the Parliament of Canada's Ethics Commissioner, released a report that said Trudeau contravened section 9 of the Conflict of Interest Act by improperly pressuring Attorney-General Jody Wilson-Raybould to drop a criminal case against SNC-Lavalin. The report details lobbying efforts by SNC-Lavalin to influence prosecution since at least February 2016, including its lobbying efforts against enacting deferred prosecution legislation. The report analyses SNC-Lavalin's interests and finds that the lobbying effort advanced private interests of the company, rather than public interests. The report's analysis section discusses the topics of prosecutorial independence and the Shawcross doctrine (dual role of Attorney General) to draw the conclusion that the influence was improper and a violation of Conflict of Interest Act thereby validating Philpott's decision to resign from cabinet over the affair. Philpott told the Canadian Press that the people of Canada still “deserve an apology” from Prime Minister Justin Trudeau on the SNC-Lavalin affair and issued a statement saying that she had taken a stand based on principle because she believes her constituents wanted her to uphold the highest ethical standard and that she welcomed the “validation” in the ethics commissioner's report. She also noted with regret that Dion was not granted "unfettered access to all information that could be relevant to the exercise" of his mandate, further stating that this is essential to ensure transparency and accountability for public office holders as it relates to conflicts of interest.

On September 3, 2019, Philpott was the only Independent candidate among the 25 candidates endorsed for the 2019 election by the GreenPAC environmental organization founded in 2014 with the goal to help recruit, elect, and support environmental leadership in Canadian politics. She ran for re-election in the 2019 federal election as an Independent but lost.

Personal life 
Philpott lives in Stouffville, Ontario. Her husband is CBC Radio journalist Pep Philpott. Their first daughter, Emily, died in Niger in 1991. They now have four children, Bethany, Jacob, David and Lydia. Philpott is a member of the Community Mennonite Church in Stouffville, Ontario.

Awards and honours 

 2021 Medical Post Power List 
 2018 Chatelaine’s Women of the Year 
 2016 Scotiabank Lectureship Award – the College of Family Physicians of Canada 
 2015 Member of the Queen’s Privy Council for Canada – Government of Canada
2014 Integrated Medical Education Award for Excellence in Community-Based Teaching (Clinic/Office/Practice), Department of Family & Community Medicine, Faculty of Medicine, University of Toronto
2013 May Cohen Equity, Diversity, and Gender Award, Association of Faculties of Medicine of Canada
2013 Yves Talbot Award for Excellence in Global Health Leadership, University of Toronto, Department of Family and Community Medicine. (Distinction) 
2012 Wilfred H. McKinnon Palmer Academic Award, University of Toronto. (Distinction)
2011 Community Service Award, University of Western Ontario, Schulich School of Medicine & Dentistry. (Distinction)
2010 Janus Scholarship for Global Health, College of Family Physicians of Canada
2009 Casey Award, Casey House, Toronto. (Distinction)
2009 Honorary Member, Federation of Medical Women of Canada. (Distinction)
2008 Stairway of Excellence Award, Galt Collegiate Institute, Cambridge, Ontario. (Distinction)
2007 Everyday Hero, Global National Television. (Distinction)

Electoral record

References

External links

1960 births
20th-century Canadian physicians
21st-century Canadian physicians
Canadian general practitioners
Canadian Mennonites
Canadian Ministers of Health
Canadian women physicians
Liberal Party of Canada MPs
Living people
Members of the 29th Canadian Ministry
Members of the House of Commons of Canada from Ontario
Members of the King's Privy Council for Canada
People from Whitchurch-Stouffville
Politicians from Toronto
Women government ministers of Canada
Women members of the House of Commons of Canada
Women in Ontario politics
21st-century Canadian women politicians
20th-century women physicians
21st-century women physicians
Independent candidates in the 2019 Canadian federal election
Academic staff of Queen's University at Kingston
Women deans (academic)
Politicians affected by a party expulsion process